Hubert Davis is a Canadian filmmaker who was nominated for an Academy Award for Documentary Short Subject and an Emmy Award for Outstanding Cultural and Artistic Programming for his directorial debut in Hardwood, a short documentary exploring the life of his father, former Harlem Globetrotter Mel Davis. Davis was the first Afro-Canadian to be nominated for an Oscar.

Davis was awarded the Don Haig award for top emerging Canadian director at the 2007 Hot Docs Canadian International Documentary Festival.

Davis' 2009 project was his documentary Invisible City. In 2012, Davis completed work on the NFB short documentary The Portrait for the Diamond Jubilee of Elizabeth II.

Filmography
 Hardwood (2006) - writer, editor, director
 Aruba (2006) - editor, director, producer
 Truth (2007) - writer, director 
 Stronger Than Love (2007) - director
 Invisible City (2009) - editor, director, producer
 Wapusk (2011) - director 
 The Portrait (2012) - director
 Giants of Africa (2016) - director
 Black Ice (2022) - director

Recognition

Awards and nominations
 2004, Won Yorkton Film Festival's Golden Sheaf Award for Best Short Subject for Hardwood
2005, Nominated for an Academy Award for 'Best Documentary, Short Subjects' for Hardwood
 2006, Won 'Panavision Grand Jury Award' at Palm Springs International ShortFest
 2007, Won Don Haig award for 'Top Emerging Canadian Director' at Hot Docs Canadian International Documentary Festival.
2007, Won Yorkton Film Festival's Golden Sheaf Award for Best Short Subject for Stronger than Love

References

External links

Watch films by Hubert Davis at the National Film Board of Canada website
PBS Web page for Hardwood

Year of birth missing (living people)
Living people
Canadian documentary film directors
Black Canadian filmmakers